Štefan Senecký (born 6 January 1980) is a Slovak international footballer who plays as a goalkeeper. He previously played for Sivasspor and MKE Ankaragücü in the Süper Lig.

International career
On 22 August 2007, Senecký made his international debut for Slovakia in a 0–1 home defeat against France in friendly. He played three qualifying games en route to qualification for the 2010 FIFA World Cup, but he was not selected to the final squad for the tournament, with Jan Mucha establishing himself as first choice.

External links
 
 TFF.org profile 
 Official player site
 Official site 
 
 

Living people
1980 births
Sportspeople from Nitra
Slovak footballers
Slovakia international footballers
Association football goalkeepers
FC Nitra players
Ankaraspor footballers
MKE Ankaragücü footballers
SK Slavia Prague players
Sivasspor footballers
MFK Ružomberok players
OFK 1948 Veľký Lapáš players
Slovak Super Liga players
Süper Lig players
Czech First League players
Slovak expatriate footballers
Slovak expatriate sportspeople in Turkey
Slovak expatriate sportspeople in the Czech Republic
Expatriate footballers in Turkey
Expatriate footballers in the Czech Republic